John Tanimola Obaro is a Nigerian technology entrepreneur, public speaker, and founder of SystemSpecs Nigeria Limited.

Early life and education
John Obaro is from Kogi State. He is of the Okun tribe in Nigeria, and was born April 19, 1958. He had his formative years in Kano and Ilorin, Kwara State, where he had elementary education. Raphael Awoseyin "unconsciously influenced" Obaro's decision to study Computer Science. Obaro had his primary education at Baptist School in Ilorin, and his secondary, at Government Secondary School, Ilorin from 1970 to 1974. It was here that Awoseyin, then a temporary teacher in the school, taught  Obaro's class mathematics. It stimulated Obaro's interest in the subject, to the point that he (Obaro) decided to study mathematics and computer science in the university. Obaro proceeded to Kwara State College of Technology, now renamed Kwara State Polytechnic for a diploma. He attended the Ahmadu Bello University where he graduated with a second class upper degree in Mathematics and Computer Science in 1979. He proceeded to have an MBA from the University of Lagos in 1981. He is an alumnus of Lagos Business School (LBS), Chief Executive Programme at the Pan-African University, Nigeria, Lagos.

Career
Obaro had his first stint in formal employment as a part-time teacher while he was pursuing his MBA. He started his professional career as a computer salesman at Leventis Group from where he moved to United Bank for Africa to take up a role in Systems Development of the financial institution. In 1984, he joined now defunct International Merchant Bank of Nigeria, one of the Nigeria's earliest investment banks, where he rose to become the Head of Information Systems. In that position, he led a team that implemented Nigeria's first international banking application on a network linking Lagos and four other states. With this feat, John led a team that pioneered Nigeria's online real‐time banking.

He moved on to found SystemSpecs Nigeria Limited, a company he nurtured from a 5-man partner agent of Systems Union, (now Infor) in 1991 to a financial technology company. Prominent among the solutions SystemSpecs has developed are Remita, HumanManager among others.

Advocacy, courses and services
He is committed to promoting and advancing of local software development. He has given presentations and speeches advocating youth empowerment and IT entrepreneurship. Obaro has served on the boards of the Ministerial Advisory Council on Information and Communication Technology, Institute of Software Practitioners of Nigeria, Computer Professionals Registration Council of Nigeria (CPN), Nigerian Information Technology Policy Drafting Committee, Governing Council of the National ICT Incubation Programme and others.

Honours and recognition
Obaro was recognised as the "Software Personality of the Year" at the Nigeria Communication Week's Beacon of Information and Communications Technology (BoICT) Awards in Lagos on April 23, 2016. He had earlier led his company to Glasgow, Scotland, where SystemSpecs was bestowed with "Leadership in Technology" award hosted by the Africa Forum Scotland for the use of Remita "as a tool of national and economic development." He was conferred a "fellow of the Centre for African Policy, Development and Research, Scotland," and had a research centre after him. In 2015, he emerged winner of 'Engineer Simeon Agu Prize for Best Software Entrepreneur' at the National Information Technology Merit Award (NITMA), an annual event organised by Nigeria Computer Society (NCS). He was awarded Nigeria's IT Personality of the Year at the same NITMA in 2013. He emerged as the 2018 FATE Model Entrepreneur of the Year based on his work as an entrepreneur and a solution provider with SystemSpecs was agreed by many to be deserving of the award.  His company received the 'Next Bull’ award at the 5th Nigerian Stocks Exchange/ BusinessDay Top CEO awards in Lagos on May 10, 2019.

References

Living people
1958 births
21st-century Nigerian businesspeople
Yoruba businesspeople
Ahmadu Bello University alumni
University of Lagos alumni
Nigerian company founders
Nigerian engineers